Deadly Duo may refer to:

 The Deadly Duo, 1971 Hong Kong Wuxia film
 Deadly Duo (film), 1962 American neo noir directed by Reginald Le Borg

See also
 The Deadly Double, a board game released in November 1941, infamous for claims that the game's advertisements contained coded messages to secret agents, giving advance notice of the Pearl Harbor attack in December 1941